Guillermo Alberto Villalobos Zanabria (born 24 July 1991) is a Mexican professional gridiron football wide receiver for the Mexicas CDMX of the Liga de Fútbol Americano Profesional (LFA). He played college football at ITESM CEM. Villalobo was drafted in the 2019 CFL-LFA Draft and played during two seasons for the Ottawa Redblacks of the Canadian Football League (CFL).

Early years
Villalobos has played American football since he was five years old. His father also played college football with the Águilas Blancas of the Instituto Politécnico Nacional. Villalobos started in lower categories playing for several teams of the Atizapán area in Greater Mexico City. After finishing high school, he was offered a scholarship to play football in the Borregos Salvajes CEM.

College career
Villalobos joined the ITESM CEM college football team, one of the most successful programs in Mexico, where he earned a major in Business Administration. Despite never winning a championship, Villalobos had a successful career: in 2015 he achieved the single-season receiving yards league record with 1230 yards in 35 catches.

After graduating, Villalobos spent one year without playing football until 2016, when he was selected by the Eagles of the newly established Liga de Fútbol Americano Profesional (LFA).

Professional career
Villalobos played in the inaugural LFA season for the Eagles, later rebranded as Mexicas, and stayed there for four seasons. His highlights include winning one championship with the team at Tazón México III, winning the MVP of Tazón México III and the 2019 award for Best Receiver.

In 2019, Villalobos was selected as the 11th pick of the 2019 CFL-LFA Draft by the Ottawa Redblacks. After going through medical checks, Villalobos joined the team in May 2019.

On July 24, 2019, Villalobos was promoted to the Redblacks' active roster, and made his CFL debut the following day against the Calgary Stampeders. In August, he landed in the team's practice roster. And on September 12, 2019, he made it again to the active roster. In total, he dressed in eight regular season games in 2019. He re-signed with the Redblacks on January 13, 2021. Villalobos was released by the Redblacks in September 2021.

Villalobos was signed by the Mexicas for the 2022 LFA season.

References

Living people
1991 births
Mexican players of American football
Mexican players of Canadian football
American football wide receivers
Borregos Salvajes CEM players
Mexicas de la Ciudad de México players
Ottawa Redblacks players
Mexican expatriate sportspeople in Canada
Canadian football wide receivers